Naked Ambition 2, also known as 3D Naked Ambition, is a 2014 Hong Kong 3D sex comedy film directed by Lee Kung-lok and starring Chapman To and Josie Ho. It is a loose sequel to Chan Hing-ka and Dante Lam's 2003 film Naked Ambition. Filming began in Tokyo in October 2013. The film parodies the Japanese adult film industry through various iconic scenes with exaggerated expressions.

Plot
Literature graduate Wyman Chan (Chapman To) writes erotic stories in the soft porn section of the newspaper for a living, but with the soft porn section ceasing publication, he loses his job. The unemployed Chan becomes capricious, and takes inspiration from men working in the Japanese adult video (AV) industry to become a producer of pornographic films. Chan's idea immediately receives enthusiastic responses from his friends, who offer their help—especially Hatoyama (Josie Ho), who is familiar with the Japanese porn industry. While everyone initially takes great interest in being a part of filming, Chan is soon forced into acting in the lead role. Surprisingly, Chan becomes a sensation in Japan for his performance of being sexually harassed and dominated by women in the AV. Hatoyama immediately travels to Hong Kong to persuade Chan to pursue his unrealistic dream—a Hong Kong man entering the Japanese AV industry.

Cast
 Chapman To as Wyman Chan (Mario Ozawa)
 Josie Ho as Shodaiko Hatoyama, Wyman's agent
 Maiko Yūki as Maiko Yūki, who cures Wyman's impotence
 Taka Kato as Taka Kato, Wyman's master
 Yui Tatsumi as Yui Tatsumi, first AV actress in Wyman's debut
 Nozomi Aso as Nozomi Aso, AV actress in "Come for a Body Checkup, Mario" segment
 Anri Okita as Anri Okita, L-cup AV actress in "Pervettes in Train" segment
 Kana Yume as Kana Yume, cute ghost in "The Horny Spirits" segment
 Tsukasa Aoi as Noriko Waiyama, AV newbie in Sailor Moon outfit
 Tyson Chak as Larry Leung, Wyman's friend
 Derek Tsang as Simon Yuen, Wyman's friend
 Candy Yuen as Cecilia Jik, Wyman's girlfriend
 Louis Koo as Naoki Nagasaki, competitor for King of AV
 Sandra Ng as Kam, Hong Kong prostitute from Golden Chicken films
 Charlene Choi as Maisora Aoi, AV actress from China
 Wong Jing as Frankie Mo, nicknamed Fat Face Dragon
 Helen To as Show Host

References

External links
 

2010s sex comedy films
2014 3D films
2014 films
2010s Cantonese-language films
Hong Kong 3D films
Hong Kong sex comedy films
Japanese pornography
Films about pornography
2014 comedy films
2010s Hong Kong films